The canton of Beaufort-en-Anjou (before March 2020: canton of Beaufort-en-Vallée) is an administrative division of the Maine-et-Loire department, in western France. Its borders were modified at the French canton reorganisation which came into effect in March 2015. Its seat is in Beaufort-en-Anjou.

It consists of the following communes:
Baugé-en-Anjou
Beaufort-en-Anjou 
Les Bois-d'Anjou 
Mazé-Milon 
Noyant-Villages 
La Pellerine

References

Cantons of Maine-et-Loire